Preobrazhenskaya Ploshchad is a Moscow Metro station in the Preobrazhenskoye District, Eastern Administrative Okrug, Moscow. It is on the Sokolnicheskaya Line, between Sokolniki and Cherkizovskaya stations.

Name
It is named after Preobrazhenskaya Square (Preobrazhenskaya Ploshchad in Russian).

History

The station opened on 31 December 1965 during the extension of the Sokolnicheskaya Line to the north. As it used to be the line's terminus, the reversing sidings are in place to the northwest of the station.

Entrances
Preobrazhenskaya Ploshchad's two vestibules are underground, with exits into Preobrazhenskaya Square, Preobrazhensky Val, Bolshaya Cherkizovskaya and Krasnobogatyrskaya streets.

Reconstruction

In December 2009 the wall renovation started. The aim was to make the walls look like the ones at Akademicheskaya station. By the middle of March 2010 the renovation was complete.

References

Moscow Metro stations
Railway stations in Russia opened in 1965
Sokolnicheskaya Line
Railway stations located underground in Russia